Olívia Kamper (born 7 June 1985 in Budapest) is a former Hungarian handballer. She was previously member of the Hungarian youth and junior national team and achieved her best result in 2003 on the Junior World Championship by winning the silver medal.

Achievements
Nemzeti Bajnokság I:
Winner: 2002
Silver Medalist: 2001, 2006
Bronze Medalist: 2004, 2005
Magyar Kupa:
Winner: 2001
Silver Medalist: 2012
EHF Cup:
Winner: 2006
World University Championship:
Winner: 2006

Individual awards
 All-Star Playmaker of the World University Championship: 2006

References

External links
 Olívia Kamper career statistics at Worldhandball

1985 births
Living people
Handball players from Budapest
Hungarian female handball players
Expatriate handball players
Hungarian expatriates in Serbia
Békéscsabai Előre NKSE players
20th-century Hungarian women
21st-century Hungarian women